Darro may refer to:

 Darro (river)
 Darro, Spain, a municipality

See also
Daro (disambiguation)